Inge Lehmann  (13 May 1888 – 21 February 1993) was a Danish seismologist and geophysicist. In 1936, she discovered that the Earth has a solid inner core inside a molten outer core. Before that, seismologists believed Earth's core to be a single molten sphere, being unable, however, to explain careful measurements of seismic waves from earthquakes, which were inconsistent with this idea. Lehmann analysed the seismic wave measurements and concluded that Earth must have a solid inner core and a molten outer core to produce seismic waves that matched the measurements. Other seismologists tested and then accepted Lehmann's explanation. Lehmann was also one of the longest-lived scientists, having lived for over 104 years.

Early life and education
Inge Lehmann was born and grew up in Østerbro, a part of Copenhagen. She was very shy as a child, a behavior that continued throughout her life. Her mother, Ida Sophie Tørsleff, was a housewife; her father was experimental psychologist Alfred Georg Ludvik Lehmann (1858–1921).

She received her school education at Fællesskolen, a pedagogically progressive high school that treated girls and boys equally, enrolling them in the same curriculum and extracurricular activities. This school was led by Hanna Adler, Niels Bohr's aunt.  According to Lehmann, her father and Adler were the most significant influences on her intellectual development.

At age 18, she achieved a first rank mark in the entrance exam for Copenhagen University. In 1907, she started her studies in mathematics, chemistry and physics at the University of Copenhagen and University of Cambridge. These studies were interrupted by poor health. She continued her studies of mathematics in Cambridge from 1910 to 1911 at Newnham College. In 1911, she returned from Cambridge feeling exhausted from the work and put her studies aside for a while. She developed good computational skills in an actuary office she worked in for a few years until she resumed studies at Copenhagen University in 1918. She completed the candidata magisterii degree in physical science and mathematics in two years, graduating in 1920. When she returned to Denmark in 1923, she accepted a position at Copenhagen University as an assistant to J.F. Steffensen, the professor of actuarial science. 

Lehmann had a younger sister, Harriet, who became a movie writer and who had family and children in contrast to Lehmann, who lived by herself all her adult life.

Career

In 1925 Lehmann's seismology career began as she became an assistant to the geodesist Niels Erik Nørlund. She was paired with three other assistants who had never so much as seen a seismograph before. She began the task of setting up seismological observatories in Denmark and Greenland. In the meantime, she studied seismology on her own. She went abroad for three months to study seismology with leading experts in the field such as Beno Gutenberg, who had determined the distance to the core-mantle boundary within 15 km of the modern accepted value.

Based on her studies in seismology, in 1928 she earned the magister scientiarum degree (equivalent to an MA) in geodesy and accepted a position as state geodesist and head of the department of seismology at the Geodetical Institute of Denmark led by Nørlund. Lehmann looked into improving the co-ordination and analysis of measurements from Europe's seismographic observatories, as well as many other scientific endeavours. These improvements lay at the heart of her later discoveries.

In a paper titled P&apos; (1936), Lehmann was the first to interpret P wave arrivals—which inexplicably appeared in the P wave shadow of the Earth's core—as reflections from an inner core, for example from the strong 1929 Murchison earthquake. Other leading seismologists of the time, such as Beno Gutenberg, Charles Richter, and Harold Jeffreys, adopted this interpretation within two or three years, but it took until 1971 for the interpretation to be shown correct by computer calculations. Lehmann was significantly hampered in her work and maintaining international contacts during the German occupation of Denmark in World War II. She served as the Chair of the Danish Geophysical Society in 1940 and 1944 respectively.

In 1952, Lehmann was considered for a professorship in geophysics at Copenhagen University, but was not appointed. In 1953, she retired from her position at the Geodetic Institute. She moved to the US for several years and collaborated with Maurice Ewing and Frank Press on investigations of Earth's crust and upper mantle. During this work, she discovered another seismic discontinuity, which is a step-change increase in the speed of seismic waves at depths between 190 and 250 km. This discontinuity was named the Lehmann discontinuity after her. Francis Birch noted that the "Lehmann discontinuity was discovered through exacting scrutiny of seismic records by a master of a black art for which no amount of computerization is likely to be a complete substitute."

Awards, honours, and legacy
Lehmann received many honours for her outstanding scientific achievements, among them the Gordon Wood Award (1960), the Emil Wiechert Medal (1964), the Gold Medal of the Danish Royal Society of Science and Letters (1965), the Tagea Brandt Rejselegat (1938 and 1967), her election as a Fellow of the Royal Society in 1969, the William Bowie Medal (1971, as the first woman), and the Medal of the Seismological Society of America in 1977. She was awarded honorary doctorates from Columbia University in 1964 and from the University of Copenhagen in 1968, as well as numerous honorific memberships.

The asteroid 5632 Ingelehmann was named in her honour and in 2015 (which was the 100th anniversary of women's suffrage in Denmark) Lehmann got, in recognition of her great struggle against the male-dominated research community that existed in Denmark in the mid-20th century, a new beetle species named after her: Globicornis (Hadrotoma) ingelehmannae sp. n., Jiří Háva & Anders Leth Damgaard, 2015.

Because of her contribution to geological science, in 1997, the American Geophysical Union established the annual Inge Lehmann Medal to honour "outstanding contributions to the understanding of the structure, composition, and dynamics of the Earth's mantle and core."

Christiane Rousseau received the 2014 George Pólya Award of the Mathematical Association of America for her article "How Inge Lehmann Discovered the Inner Core of the Earth".

In 2015, on the 127th anniversary of her birth, Google dedicated its worldwide Google Doodle to her.

A new memorial dedicated to Lehmann was installed on Frue Plads in Copenhagen in 2017. The monument is designed by Elisabeth Toubro.

Key publications

See also
Richard Dixon Oldham
List of geophysicists
Timeline of women in science

References

Further reading

External links
 Inge Lehmann at CWP at UCLA
 Royal Society citation
 Inge Lehmann: Discoverer of Earth's Inner Core
 
 

Danish geophysicists
Seismologists
1888 births
1993 deaths
Danish women geologists
Alumni of the University of Cambridge
Foreign Members of the Royal Society
University of Copenhagen alumni
Danish centenarians
20th-century  Danish  physicists
Women geophysicists
Scientists from Copenhagen
20th-century Danish women scientists
Women centenarians